Pitko is a surname. Notable people with the surname include:

Alex Pitko (1914–2011), American baseball player
Janne Pitko (born 1981), Finnish curler and professional poker player
Jenni Pitko (born 1986), Finnish politician